The UEFA Congress is the supreme controlling organ of the Union of European Football Associations (UEFA). UEFA is the administrative body for association football and futsal in Europe, and is one of six continental confederations of world football's governing body, the Fédération Internationale de Football Association (FIFA). UEFA consists of 55 member associations.

The congresses may be ordinary or extraordinary. Ordinary congresses meet annually, typically between February and May. An extraordinary congress may be convened by the UEFA Executive Committee, or at the written request of one fifth or more of the UEFA member associations, to deal with financial matters and/or matters of particular significance. Each of the 55 members of UEFA has one vote in the congress. The members of UEFA are responsible for electing the UEFA president and the members of the UEFA Executive Committee.

The most recent edition, the 45th Ordinary UEFA Congress, was held on 11 May 2022 in Vienna, Austria. The next congress is scheduled to be held on 5 April 2023 in Lisbon, Portugal.

History
UEFA was founded on 15 June 1954 in Basel, Switzerland, and began with 31 members. The first congress was held the following year, on 2 March 1955 in Vienna, Austria. Until 1968, the meetings were known as general assemblies. The first extraordinary congress was held on 11 December 1959 in Paris, France. The most recent extraordinary congress was held on 20 September 2017 in Zürich, the 13th to take place. The ordinary congress was initially held annually up until 1958, when the delegates decided to amend the UEFA Statutes so the congress would follow a biennial schedule. Starting in 2003, the congress returned to an annual meeting, which was decided at the congress in 2002, mainly to facilitate the financial management of UEFA. On three occasions, two congress—an ordinary and extraordinary—have been held in the same year (in 1968, 2007 and 2017), while 2016 was the only year to see three congresses take place, due to two extraordinary meetings being held. The congress is typically held on a single day, though four congresses were held over two consecutive days: in 2000, 2004, 2007 and 2009.

All congresses have been held within a UEFA member association, except for the 4th Extraordinary UEFA Congress, which took place in Monte Carlo, Monaco. Italy has hosted both the most overall and ordinary congresses with seven, all taking placing in Rome, of which five were ordinary and two extraordinary. Switzerland has hosted the most extraordinary congresses with five, though Rome is tied with Geneva and Zürich for the most extraordinary congresses by city with two. Four cities have held both an ordinary and extraordinary congress: Helsinki, London, Paris and Rome. As of 2020, the 44 ordinary congresses have been held in 30 cities, while the 13 extraordinary congresses have been held in 10 cities, for a total of 57 congresses in 36 cities.

Responsibilities
The following matters are within the power of the UEFA Congress:

receipt and consideration of the annual report, financial report and the auditors' report
approval of the annual accounts and budget
election of the UEFA president
election of UEFA Executive Committee members
ratification of the Executive Committee members elected by the European Club Association and European Leagues
election of the European members of the FIFA Council
election of the auditing body
amendments to the UEFA Statutes
addition or removal of a member association
decisions on the lifting or continuation of the suspension of a member association, UEFA Executive Committee member or a member of another body
bestowal of honorary presidency or membership

List of congresses

Ordinary

Extraordinary

See also
 List of presidents of UEFA
 FIFA Congress

Notes

References

External links
 

UEFA
International conferences
Recurring sporting events established in 1955